Convoy PQ 12 was an Arctic convoy sent from Great Britain by the Western Allies to aid the Soviet Union during World War II. It sailed in March 1942, reaching Murmansk despite a sortie against it by the German battleship Tirpitz. 
All ships arrived safely.

Ships
PQ 12 consisted of 16 ships under the command of Commodore H.T. Hudson. The Close Escort comprised the minesweeper  and five whalers.

Distant cover was provided by two Heavy Cover Forces; one comprising the battleship  (Vice Admiral Alban Curteis commanding), the battlecruiser  and six destroyers, sailing from Reykjavik and another led by Admiral John Tovey comprising the battleship , the carrier , the cruiser  and six destroyers, sailing from Scapa Flow.

Action
PQ 12 sailed from Reykjavik on 1 March 1942 with its Close Escort. It was joined on 5 March by the Ocean Escort and on 6 March by the cruiser Kenya. Also at sea were the Heavy Cover Forces, Curteis from Reykjavik sailing on 3 March and Tovey from Scapa Flow on 4 March.

On 5 March the convoy was sighted by a German reconnaissance aircraft and on 6 March, after obtaining permission from Hitler to do so, Tirpitz sortied from Trondheim with three destroyers as escort. This was Operation Sportpalast, and was intended to find and destroy PQ 12 and its reciprocal, QP 8, which was also at sea.

Shortly after sailing Tirpitz was sighted by the patrolling submarine  and the Heavy Cover Forces, now joined, sought to bring Tirpitz to action.

Tirpitz had no success, though her destroyers encountered one straggler from QP 8, the freighter Ijora, and sank her. Finally on 9 March as Tirpitz headed for home, she was sighted by aircraft from Victorious and attacked, though also without success.

PQ 12 arrived at Murmansk on 12 March. No ships were lost, though the escort suffered one whaler lost, Shera, capsized by ice buildup, and Oribi, damaged by pack ice. On 24 March, Lancaster Castle was dive-bombed alongside the quay in Murmansk and eight men were killed. It was towed out and moored in the river, the crew remaining on board. A few days later it was dive-bombed again and received five hits. There were no casualties but the crew moved to shore.

PQ 12 provided valuable military equipment and other materials for the Soviet war effort. The distribution of equipment and supplies delivered with PQ 12 was the subject of a Soviet State Defence Committee decree.

Ships in the convoy

Allied merchant ships
The ships of the convoy arrived at Reykjavik on 27 February.

Convoy escorts
Navy ships escorted the convoy at various times during its journey.

Notes

References
 Clay Blair : Hitler's U-Boat War Vol I (1996) 
 Paul Kemp : Convoy! Drama in Arctic Waters (1993) 
 Bernard Schofield : (1964) The Russian Convoys BT Batsford  ISBN (none)
  PQ 12 at Convoyweb

PQ 12
C